The Boettcher Scholarship is a four-year, full-tuition and partial living expenses merit-based academic scholarship awarded to graduating Colorado high school students. Award recipients, on average, rank in the top 2% of their graduating classes and have an average SAT score around 1400 (roughly the 97th percentile).

The award is considered "full-ride" and allows Boettcher Scholars to attend any accredited Colorado university for 4 years without significant expenditure by the student. 50 students are awarded Boettcher Scholarships each year, beginning with the class of 2022, representing about 3% of applicants. They are selected from 100 finalists who are interviewed by the Foundation board. 300 semi-finalists are required to add a teacher recommendation to their application with the hopes of advancing to be a finalist. In the 2021–2022 season over 1,600 students applied. If a student declines the scholarship, alternates are promoted from the pool of finalists so that all scholarships are used. 

The program was started in 1952 with the intention of keeping high-performing students in Colorado. The most popular destination has been the University of Colorado at Boulder, although significant numbers of Scholars have attended the University of Denver, Colorado State University, Colorado College and the Colorado School of Mines. The associated Teacher Recognition Awards Program was started in 1992.

Boettcher Scholars have subsequently been awarded well-known graduate scholarships, including Marshall Scholarships, Rhodes Scholarships, and National Science Foundation Graduate Research Fellowships (NSF-GRFP) to continue their studies. Currently, there are roughly 2,000 Boettcher Scholar alumni, more than half of whom reside in Colorado.

Notable recipients 
 Dee Bradley Baker
 Nick Counter
 Donna Haraway
 James Heckman

References 

Scholarships in the United States
Education in Colorado